Bellator 272: Pettis vs. Horiguchi was a mixed martial arts event produced by Bellator MMA that took place on December 3, 2021 at the Mohegan Sun Arena in Uncasville, Connecticut.

Background 
Sergio Pettis made his first defence of the Bellator Bantamweight World Championship after winning his first major promotional title in May when he defeated then-champ Juan Archuleta by unanimous decision in the main event of Bellator 258. Kyoji Horiguchi, meanwhile, competed under the Bellator banner for the first time as a rostered fighter on a multifight deal. In June 2019, Horiguchi was lent by RIZIN to Bellator for a one-off fight against Darrion Caldwell – a bout Horiguchi won by unanimous decision to become champion. He later vacated the title after Horiguchi suffered a knee injury that forced him to relinquish the title while he was recovering from surgery.

A featherweight bout between John de Jesus and Keoni Diggs was scheduled for this event. However, Diggs had to pull out due to unknown reasons and was replaced by Kai Kamaka III.

A lightweight bout between Dan Moret and Mandel Nallo was scheduled for this event. Nallo subsequently pulled out of the bout and was replaced by Ricardo Seixas. Seixas would pull out of the bout due to unknown reasons and was replaced by Spike Carlyle, with the bout being a catchweight bout at 160 lb.

A lightweight bout between Jay Jay Wilson and Alfie Davis was scheduled for this event, however Davis pulled out of the bout due to unknown reasons.

At the weigh-ins, Jared Scoggins missed weight for his bout, weighing in at 140 pounds, 4 pounds over the bantamweight non-title fight limit. The bout proceeded at catchweight and Scoggins was fined 35%  of his purse which went to his opponent Josh Hill.

Results

See also 

 2021 in Bellator MMA
 List of Bellator MMA events
 List of current Bellator fighters
 Bellator MMA Rankings

References 

Bellator MMA events
Events in Uncasville, Connecticut
2021 in mixed martial arts
December 2021 sports events in the United States
2021 in sports in Connecticut
Mixed martial arts in Connecticut
Sports competitions in Connecticut